St Andrew's Church is located in the village of Westhall near Halesworth. It is an active Anglican parish church in the deanery of Waveney and Blyth, part of the archdeaconry of Suffolk, and the Diocese of St Edmundsbury and Ipswich.

Layout

The church is of flint construction and comprises a nave, south aisle chancel and tower.
The church has a non-standard design and layout. The tower, dating from the 13th century with a post-Reformation bell-stage, splits into both a northern and easterly direction. The eastern section being a Norman construct, while to the north is a large 13th-century thatched nave containing 19th-century pews. Beyond the nave is a 14th-century chancel.
The unusual layout is due to the church having been extended from the original Norman building and the original church becoming what is now the church's south aisle.
The eastern entrance dates from around 1100 and stonework including depictions of humans and animals including bird head grotesques and human/animal hybrids as well as unfinished faces are still visible.

Font and screens
Located in the nave is a font which contains seven sacramental panels depicting the Sacraments of the Catholic Church. The panel depicting Mass has been used in Eamon Duffy's book The Stripping of the Altars.

As well as the font the nave contains a painted screen depicting various saints.

The south side of the screen contains the Saints Etheldreda, Sitha, Agnes, Bridget, Catherine, Dorothy, Margaret of Aleppo and Apollonia.
The north side of the screen contains images of Saint James, St Leonard, Saint Michael and Saint Clement. 
Alongside these images on the north side are depictions of the Transfiguration of Jesus. Christ on a mountain top between the two figures of Moses and Elijah. It is the only surviving medieval screen representation of the Transfiguration in England.
The final panel on the north side depicts Saint Anthony of Egypt.

Wall paintings
Located on the north wall is a painting of St Christopher and other figures including Moses.
Other wall paintings include a flower-surrounded consecration cross beside the south door and a niche alcove in the eastern side of a window in the south wall. 
Alongside the painted niche and consecration cross there are surviving traces of a large painting consisting of seven large roundels surrounded in leafwork.

Monuments and brass-work
In the south-east corner of the church is the tomb of Nicholas Bohun (1602) which includes a brass plaque. On the south wall is the coat of arms of George III.
In the chancel are located the remains of two Chalice brasses. located in the ceiling of the chancel is also a depiction of the Holy Trinity, with God the Father holding the Crucified Christ between his knees.

Listed status
St Andrew's Church was listed at Grade I on 1 September 1953.

See also 
Grade I listed buildings in Suffolk

References

External links

Church of England church buildings in Suffolk
13th-century church buildings in England
Grade I listed churches in Suffolk